Herbager (1956 – 25 March 1976) was a French Thoroughbred racehorse and an influential sire in both France and the United States.

Background
Herbager was sired by Vandale, a stayer who won the 1946 Prix du Conseil Municipal and whom Herbager helped make the 1959 Leading sire in France. His dam was Flagette (by Escamillo), who was inbred 2x2 to St. Leger winner Firdaussi, meaning both her parents were sired by him.

During his racing career he was owned by Simone Del Duca and trained by Pierre Pelat.

Racing career
Herbager made two starts at age two, finishing second once and winning the Prix Seraphine. At age three, he was the best colt in his age group in France, winning important races including the Grand Prix de Saint-Cloud and the Classic French Derby in which he earned a Timeform rating of 136. In the Prix de l'Arc de Triomphe, he sustained a serious leg injury but finished only two lengths from the winner. This injury ended his racing career.

Stud record
Herbager was retired to stud for the 1960 season in France and in December 1964 was sold for US$700,000 to the prominent Kentucky breeder Bull Hancock. Hancock then syndicated Herbager and moved him to his Claiborne Farm. At Claiborne Farm, the horse sired sixty-four stakes winners and became a major stamina influence.

Major winners
c = colt, f = filly, g = gelding

Damsire:
Some of Herbager's daughters who produced foals that went on to racing success include:
 Ballade (1972), was purchased as a yearling by Canadian E. P. Taylor. As a broodmare, she stood at Taylor's Windfields Farm. Ballade was voted the 1992 Sovereign Award for Outstanding Broodmare. She was the dam of major stakes winners Glorious Song and Devil's Bag, plus Saint Ballado, who in turn sired 2005 American Horse of the Year Saint Liam as well as 2-time Eclipse Award winner Ashado
 Bete A Bon Dieu (1964) - dam of Buckskin, winner of the Prix du Cadran (2x), Jockey Club Cup, Doncaster Cup
 I Will Follow (1975) - dam of Rainbow Quest, winner of the 1985 Coronation Cup and Prix de l'Arc de Triomphe.

Herbager died on 25 March 1976 at the age of twenty at Claiborne Farm in Paris, Kentucky and is buried in their main equine cemetery.

Pedigree

References

 Herbager profile at Thoroughbred Heritage
 McLean, Ken. Designing Speed in the Racehorse (2006) Russell Meerdink Co. Ltd. 

1956 racehorse births
1976 racehorse deaths
Racehorses bred in France
Racehorses trained in France
French Thoroughbred Classic Race winners
Thoroughbred family 16-c
Chefs-de-Race